Bhabanipur Assembly constituency is one of the 126 assembly constituencies of the Assam Legislative Assembly in India. Bhabanipur forms part of Kokrajhar Lok Sabha constituency. There is an assembly segment by the same name in West Bengal Vidhan Sabha as well.

Town details

Country: India.
 State: Assam.
 District: Bajali district.
 Lok Sabha Constituency: Kokrajhar Lok Sabha/Parliamentary constituency.
 Assembly Categorisation: Rural
 Literacy Level: 79%.
 Eligible Electors as per 2021 General Elections: 1,17,396 Eligible Electors. Male Electors:75,355 . Female Electors: 72,693.
 Geographic Co-Ordinates:    26°31'21.7"N 91°04'48.4"E..
 Total Area Covered: 378 square kilometres.
 Area Includes: Bhabanipur mouza in Barpeta thana; Bijni mouza in Sorbhog thana; and Hastinapur mouza in Patacharkuchithana, in Barpeta sub-division, of Bajali district of Assam.
 Inter State Border : Bajali.
 Number Of Polling Stations: Year 2011-167,Year 2016-169,Year 2021-41.

Members of Vidhan Sabha 

Following is the list of past members representing Bihpuria Assembly constituency in Assam Legislature.

 1962: Mahadeb Das, Indian National Congress.
 1967: D. Choudhary, Indian National Congress.
 1972: Ghana Kanta Baro, Revolutionary Communist Party of India.
 1978: Tarini Charan Das, Janata Party.  
 1983: Mir Abdul Halim, Indian National Congress.
 1985: Surendra Medhi, Independent.
 1991: Milan Boro, Independent.
 1996: Surendra Medhi, Asom Gana Parishad.
 1998: Binod Gayari.
 2000: Dr. Manoranjan Das, Asom Gana Parishad.
 2001: Sarbananda Choudhury, Indian National Congress.
 2006: Dr. Manoranjan Das, Asom Gana Parishad.
 2011: Abul Kalam Azad, All India United Democratic Front. 
 2016: Abul Kalam Azad, All India United Democratic Front.
 2021: Phanidhar Talukdar, All India United Democratic Front. 
2021 (by-polls): Phanidhar Talukdar, Bharatiya Janata Party.

Election results

2021 by-election

2021 Vidhan Sabha Elections

2016 Vidhan Sabha Elections

2011 result
 Abul Kalam Azad (AIUDF) : 24,756 votes
 Phanidhar Talukdar (IND) : 19,714

References

External links 
 

Assembly constituencies of Assam